The Kearney County Courthouse is a historic building in Minden, Nebraska, and the courthouse of Kearney County, Nebraska. It was the third building to house the county courthouse when it was completed in 1906–1907. Prior buildings had been completed in 1878 and 1879. The third courthouse was designed in the Classical Revival style by architect George A. Berlinghof. Writing for the National Register of Historic Places form, Barbara Beving Long highlights the "symmetrical arrangement, monumental proportions (especially the large smooth squared pilasters), pedimented pavilions, smooth surface, and unadorned parapet, [...] the attractive roundarched entries with keystones, squared pilasters (at corners and pavilions), ground floor arcades, and the mighty central dome resting on its octagonal drum." She adds, "Rectangular windows have transoms and lack special lintel or sill treatment." The building has been listed on the National Register of Historic Places since January 10, 1990.

References

National Register of Historic Places in Kearney County, Nebraska
Neoclassical architecture in Nebraska
Buildings and structures completed in 1906
1906 establishments in Nebraska